Kołaczek  is a settlement in the administrative district of Gmina Jaktorów, within Grodzisk Mazowiecki County, Masovian Voivodeship, in east-central Poland.

References

Villages in Grodzisk Mazowiecki County